Clinton Ford may refer to:

Clinton Ford (singer) (1931–2009), British singer who scored four UK hit singles between 1959 and 1967
Clinton B. Ford, American astronomer and violinist
Clint Ford, American screenwriter and actor (b. 1976)